TOET (methylthio-ethyl-methoxyamphetamines) is a pair of lesser-known psychedelic drugs and substituted amphetamines. 2-TOET and 5-TOET are the 2- and 5-methylthio analogs of DOET, respectively. They were first synthesized by Alexander Shulgin and written up in his book PiHKAL.  Very little is known about their dangers or toxicity.

TOET compounds

2-TOET
 Dosage: 65 mg or greater
 Duration: unknown
 Effects: few to none

5-TOET
 Dosage: 12–25 mg
 Duration: 8–24 hours
 Effects: nystagmus, strong LSD-like visuals and hallucinations, eyes-closed imagery

See also 
 Phenethylamine
 Psychedelics, dissociatives and deliriants

References 

Substituted amphetamines